"Hot Chocolat" is a promotional single by Tommy february6 to promote her album, "february & heavenly". The song peaked at #86 on the Billboard Japan Hot 100 singles chart.

Track list

References

External links 
 Tommy february6 Official Site

2012 songs
2012 singles
Tomoko Kawase songs
Songs written by Tomoko Kawase
Songs written by Shunsaku Okuda
Warner Music Japan singles